Nana is a 1934 American pre-Code film, produced by Samuel Goldwyn, released through United Artists, starring Anna Sten. and directed by Dorothy Arzner and George Fitzmaurice.

This version of Émile Zola's 1880 novel and heroine was to be the vehicle for Sten's triumph as Samuel Goldwyn's trained, groomed and heavily promoted answer to Greta Garbo.  Despite a record-breaking opening week at Radio City Music Hall, Sten was beautiful but disappointing.

Goldwyn's tutoring of Sten is mentioned in Cole Porter's 1934 song "Anything Goes" from the musical of the same name: "If Sam Goldwyn can with great conviction / Instruct Anna Sten in diction / Then Anna shows / Anything goes."

Plot
A Parisian streetwalker is discovered by a theatrical impresario and becomes a stage success. At her height of popularity, she falls in love with a soldier, and draws both ire and fascination from his protective older brother.

Cast
 Anna Sten as Nana
 Lionel Atwill as Colonel André Muffat
 Richard Bennett as Gaston Greiner
 Mae Clarke as Satin
 Phillips Holmes as Lieutenant George Muffat
 Reginald Owen as Bordenave
 Helen Freeman as Sabine Muffat
 Lawrence Grant as Grand Duke Alexis
 Jessie Ralph as Zoe
 Ferdinand Gottschalk as Finot
 Paul Hurst as Employer (uncredited)
 Tom Ricketts as Party Guest (uncredited)

Reception
The film was a box office disappointment.

References

External links  
 
 
 

1934 films
American black-and-white films
1930s English-language films
Films based on works by Émile Zola
Films directed by George Fitzmaurice
Films directed by Dorothy Arzner
Samuel Goldwyn Productions films
1934 drama films
American drama films
Films set in Paris
Films set in 1868
1930s American films